Heart Gloucestershire (formerly Severn Sound) was a local radio station owned and operated by Global Radio as part of the Heart network. It broadcast to Gloucestershire from studios in Gloucester.

The transmitter was at Churchdown Hill, just west of the M5; the same transmitter as Radio Gloucestershire.

History

Severn Sound started transmissions on 23 October 1980, from its first studio at the "Old Talbot Pub" in Southgate Street, Gloucester. The pub had been bought by local businessmen including Clive Lindley (Chairman of the Roadchef motorway service stations and Chairman of Severn Sound).The station's first employee was Chief Engineer Quentin Howard, who converted the pub into the radio station.

The original presenters were Alan Roberts (Head of Music) on Breakfast, Christopher Musk on mid-mornings, Eddie Vickers (Programme Controller) on the Lunchtime News and Topical programme, Laura de Vere on the Afternoon Show and Steve Ellis on Drivetime.  There used to be a Sunday lunchtime show where the presenter would go to various areas of Gloucester and share Sunday lunch with the residents of that house.

One notable director was the writer Dennis Potter, who played an active role in the station's early years and lived in Ross on Wye. Potter's Pennies from Heaven producer, Kenith Trodd, presented a Sunday programme of 78 records featuring singers such as Al Bowlly, which Todd and Potter had used in Pennies from Heaven. Another Director was England rugby player, Mike Burton, who also started Gulliver's Travels, a sports travel agency.

On 1 July 1984 two of the station's engineers, Nigel Lane and Tony Cooper, were killed on an outside broadcast. The telescopic mast of their radio car touched an overhead 11 kV power line, whilst they were preparing for a live broadcast from Sudeley Castle, Winchcombe. The inquiry into the accident found Severn Sound guilty of health and safety offences and fined the company £2,500. Many new safety procedures for radio cars were introduced across the whole industry as a result of the accident.

The station was sold to the Chiltern Radio Group, after some resistance, in 1989 and was later taken over by the GWR Group in 1995. GCap Media was sold to Global Radio in 2008.

During the Gloucester/Tewkesbury flood crisis of Summer 2007, Severn Sound was forced to move, temporarily, to the GWR FM Bristol Studios, due to a loss of electricity and running water.

Split frequencies

In 1990, Severn Sound split frequencies, with its 774 kHz AM frequency being renamed Three Counties Radio, expanding to cover Hereford & Worcester. This was an "oldies" station and was a mix of local programmes and networking from Chiltern Radio Network's Supergold service. Presenters who moved from Severn Sound to Three Counties included Tony Peters & Sally Low Hurry. John Hellings was brought in as breakfast presenter. In 1992, Three Counties Radio was re-branded as Severn Sound Supergold (it also stopped being promoted in Hereford & Worcester) and was re-branded again, in 1996, by new owners GWR as Severn Sound Classic Gold. Ownership rules meant that GWR had to sell all their Classic Gold licences to UBC Media and another re-brand to Classic Gold 774 followed. Today, the heritage name "Severn" is no longer mentioned on 774 AM after it was re-branded again, in 2007, to Gold, and again on 24 March 2014 to Smooth Radio, all programming on 774 AM now comes from London.

Rebrand

In September 2008, it was announced that Severn Sound would become Heart Gloucestershire as part of a national re-branding exercise by owners Global Radio, which has seen twenty-nine stations renamed as Heart Radio.

The new Heart Gloucestershire branding was launched at 6am on Monday 23 March 2009 with local programming broadcast from the above-the-street Bridge Studios, part of the Eastgate Shopping Centre (The Mall) in Gloucester. Local news bulletins on the station are now produced by Heart West in Bristol, following the closure of its Gloucester newsroom during the summer of 2010.

Station merger
On 26 February 2019, Global announced Heart Gloucestershire would be merged with three sister stations in Bristol and Somerset, Devon and Cornwall and Wiltshire.

From 3 June 2019, local output will consist of a three-hour regional Drivetime show on weekdays, alongside localised news bulletins, traffic updates and advertising.

Heart Gloucestershire's studios in Gloucester closed with operations moving to Bristol - the station ceased local programming on 31 May 2019. Local breakfast and weekend shows were replaced with network programming from London.

Heart West began broadcasting regional programming on 3 June 2019.

See also
 Heart (radio network)

References

External links

Radio stations in Gloucestershire
Radio stations established in 1980
Defunct radio stations in the United Kingdom
Gloucestershire